The INTERSALT Study was a 1988 international observational study which investigated the link between dietary salt, as measured by urinary excretion, and blood pressure. The study was based on a sample of 10,079 men and women aged 20–59 sampled from 52 populations around the world. The authors of the study attempted to provide a widespread international investigation of the correlation between dietary salt intake and blood pressure in a systematic and standardized way with regards for relevant confounding variables, beyond just age and sex.

Results
The study claimed to have found a significant causal relationship between dietary salt intake and blood pressure.

Reception and Criticism

The results were disputed by the Salt Institute (the salt producers' trade organisation), who demanded that the results be handed over for re-analysis.  A re-analysis was published in 1996 and the results were the same.  The results have since been confirmed by the TOHP I and TOHP II studies.

In 1997 the journalist Gary Taubes, published an article in Science, which was heavily critical of the statistical analysis published by Intersalt.  He criticized the failure to account for population heterogeneity in establishing the weak association between salt intake and blood pressure and the assumptions made when deploying regression dilution bias.  He also cited the TOHP II study as showing only "negligible benefit of salt reduction".

In 2008, the statisticians David A. Freedman and Diana Pettiti published an article showing that the positive correlation between blood pressure and salt consumption observed in the InterSalt study was entirely driven by four outlying data points of the 52 total data points. These four communities had much lower salt consumption than the average community, as well as much lower blood pressure. When these four points were excluded, the correlation was in fact negative, contradicting the original interpretation of the data by the researchers. Freedman and Pettiti raised questions about why the researchers had failed to apply even basic robustness checks, and criticised the overly simplistic view presented by medical researchers and policymakers of the role of salt in blood pressure outcomes.

References

Clinical trials